McGaw is a surname.

McGaw may also refer to:
 McGaw, Ohio, a community in the United States
 McGaw, Ontario, a ghost town in Ontario, Canada
 McGaw Peak, in West Antarctica
 McGaw Medical Center, an American hospital network